This article lists important figures and events in Malaysian public affairs during the year 1984, together with births and deaths of notable Malaysians.

Incumbent political figures

Federal level
Yang di-Pertuan Agong:
Sultan Ahmad Shah (until 25 April)
Sultan Iskandar (from 26 April)
Raja Permaisuri Agong:
Tengku Ampuan Afzan (until 25 April)
Sultanah Zanariah (from 26 April)
Prime Minister: Dato' Sri Dr Mahathir Mohamad
Deputy Prime Minister: Dato' Musa Hitam
Lord President: Azlan Shah then Mohamed Salleh Abas

State level
 Sultan of Johor: Tunku Ibrahim Ismail (Regent from 26 April)
 Sultan of Kedah: Sultan Abdul Halim Muadzam Shah
 Sultan of Kelantan: Sultan Ismail Petra
 Raja of Perlis: Tuanku Syed Putra
 Sultan of Perak:
Sultan Idris Shah II (until 31 January)
Sultan Azlan Shah (from 3 February) (Deputy Yang di-Pertuan Agong)
 Sultan of Pahang: Tengku Abdullah (Regent until 25 April)
 Sultan of Selangor: Sultan Salahuddin Abdul Aziz Shah
 Sultan of Terengganu: Sultan Mahmud Al-Muktafi Billah Shah
 Yang di-Pertuan Besar of Negeri Sembilan: Tuanku Jaafar
 Yang di-Pertua Negeri (Governor) of Penang: Tun Dr Awang Hassan
 Yang di-Pertua Negeri (Governor) of Malacca:
Tun Syed Zahiruddin bin Syed Hassan (Until February)
Tun Syed Ahmad Al-Haj bin Syed Mahmud Shahabuddin (From February)
 Yang di-Pertua Negeri (Governor) of Sarawak: Tun Abdul Rahman Ya'kub
 Yang di-Pertua Negeri (Governor) of Sabah: Tun Mohd Adnan Robert

Events 
1 January – Hotel Majestic (later occupied by Balai Seni Lukis Negara (National Art Gallery)) was closed after 52 years of operation. It reopened in 2012.
11 January – Dr. Zaini Shaarani, an employee of Kuala Lumpur City Hall (DBKL) became the first Malaysian to scale the Mount Kala Pattar in the Himalayas.
12 January – The National Incorporation policy and Agriculture policy were introduced.
January – The federal government planned to build a transit system between Sentul and Petaling Jaya.
31 January – Sultan Idris Shah II of Perak died suddenly after suffering a heart attack in Lumut, Perak. On 3 February, he was replaced by his nephew, Sultan Azlan Shah as the 34th Sultan of Perak.
1 February – Official opening of the Bandar Tun Razak (formerly Kampung Konggo) by the Prime Minister, Mahathir Mohamad in conjunction with the 10th anniversary of the Federal Territory of Kuala Lumpur. 
February – The Kuala Lumpur International Marathon was held for the first time.
February – Johore Safari World closed after three years of operation.
11 April – Official opening of the new Sabah Museum by the Yang di-Pertuan Agong, Sultan Ahmad Shah of Pahang.
16 April – Labuan island became the second Federal Territory after Kuala Lumpur.
26 April – Sultan Iskandar of Johor was elected as the eighth Yang di-Pertuan Agong, replacing Sultan Ahmad Shah of Pahang.
5 May – Dayabumi, the famous landmark in Kuala Lumpur was opened.
17 May – The Edaran Otomobil Nasional Berhad (EON) was established.
7 June – The name "Saga" was chosen for the first national cars.
22 September – Sultan Iskandar of Johor was installed as the eighth Yang di-Pertuan Agong.

Births
29 January – Safee Sali, footballer
28 March – Fasha Sandha – Actress
30 June – Tunku Ismail Ibrahim – Tunku Mahkota (Crown Prince) of Johor and officer of the Indian Army
4 December – Leong Mun Yee – Diver

Deaths
31 January – Sultan Idris Shah II of Perak

See also 
 1984
 1983 in Malaysia | 1985 in Malaysia
 History of Malaysia

 
Years of the 20th century in Malaysia
Malaysia
Malaysia
1980s in Malaysia